Working-class culture is a range of cultures created by or popular among working-class people. The cultures can be contrasted with high culture and folk culture, and are often equated with popular culture and low culture (the counterpart of high culture). Working-class culture developed during the Industrial Revolution. Because most of the newly created working-class were former peasants, the cultures took on much of the localised folk culture. This was soon altered by the changed conditions of social relationships and the increased mobility of the workforce and later by the marketing of mass-produced cultural artefacts such as prints and ornaments and commercial entertainment such as music hall and cinema.

In western cultures, working-class culture has become increasingly associated with alcoholism, domestic abuse, obesity and deliquency.

Politics of working class culture 
Many socialists with a class struggle viewpoint see working class culture as a vital element of the proletariat which they champion. One of the first organisations for proletarian culture was Proletkult, founded in Russia shortly after the February Revolution, supported by Alexander Bogdanov, who had been co-leader of the Bolsheviks with Vladimir Lenin. The group included both Bolsheviks and their critics, and Bogdanov struggled to retain its independence following the Bolshevik Revolution in October 1917. His erstwhile ally Anatoly Lunacharsky had rejoined the Bolsheviks and was appointed Commissar for Education. 

Marxist–Leninist states have declared an official working-class culture, most notably socialist realism, whose constant aim is to glorify the worker, in contrast to typical independent working-class cultures. However, Lenin believed that there could be no authentic proletarian culture free from capitalism and that high culture should be brought to the workers. 

The millenarian nature of socialist working class art is evident in the goals espoused by the leaders of revolutionary movements. The art forms for the masses were meant to shape a new consciousness and form the basis of a new culture and new man.

Portrayals in popular culture 

Working-class cultures are extremely geographically diverse, leading some to question whether they have anything in common. In the United States, working-class culture has been portrayed on TV shows such as Roseanne, Good Times, Married...With Children, All in the Family, Family Guy, The Simpsons, and South Park, in which American families struggle with day-to-day working life. A variant of US working-class culture is Southern culture, as depicted in TV shows such as The Dukes of Hazzard, King of the Hill or The Beverly Hillbillies. While American soap operas deal with the lifestyles of the middle and upper classes, in the United Kingdom they are the opposite: shows such as Coronation Street, Brookside, EastEnders, and Only Fools and Horses deal with the struggles of working-class life in their respective settings: Weatherfield (a thinly veiled Salford), Liverpool and Walford (commonly associated with Bromley-by-Bow). Another example is Shameless, which highlights working-class life in Stretford, a Manchester suburb, as does its American adaptation set in Chicago. TV shows such as Regular Show and Beavis and Butthead portray working-class friends. SpongeBob SquarePants, Bob the Builder, and Handy Manny are very well-known TV shows featuring working-class titular characters. Happy Tree Friends has a working-class beaver character named Handy. One of Australian pub rock singer Jimmy Barnes' more popular songs, "Working Class Man" references working class culture and hardships.

Along with lad culture in the United Kingdom, some youth subcultures such as skinheads, mods, punks, rockers and metalheads have been associated with working class culture. In the United States, some White Americans have reclaimed the usually derogatory term redneck as an identifier with working-class White Americans. Many may deliberately embrace redneck stereotypes but choose to avoid usage of the word due to its frequent association with negative attitudes such as racism. Jeff Foxworthy and Larry the Cable Guy of the Blue Collar Comedy Tour are among the most popularized examples of redneck culture being embraced with humor. Many Irish, French, Mediterranean, Italian, Latin American and Eastern European communities within the United States, Canada, United Kingdom, Australia, and New Zealand are also identifiers of working class culture. Similarly to rednecks, they also often embrace themselves. Some sports such as rugby league football, darts and association football, which is sometimes referred to as the working man's game, are associated with the working class in the United Kingdom. In the United States, ten-pin bowling, American football, basketball and baseball are associated with the working class.

See also 

 Blue collar
 Industrial novel
 Kitchen sink realism
 Labor history
 Proletkult
 Proletarian literature
 Proletarian novel
 Proletarian poetry

References

Further reading 

 
Social class subcultures